Maison Hermès is a building in Tokyo, Japan. It is located at 5-4-1 Ginza, Chuo-ku, Tokyo. Constructed between 1998 and 2001, it was designed by Renzo Piano assisted by Bohlin Cywinski Jackson of Berkeley, California and in collaboration with Takenaka Corporation. The building is the flagship store and corporate headquarters of Hermès, the French luxury empire of Jean-Louis Dumas. It is a 6,000 square metre (65,000 square feet) structure that houses workshops and offices, a shopping space, exhibition areas and multimedia quarters. In addition to a roof garden at the top of the building, there is also a recess which divides the long facade into two, forming a courtyard that delivers an access to the subway two levels below.

References
http://archrecord.construction.com/projects/bts/archives/retail/hermes/overview.asp
http://www.galinsky.com/buildings/hermes/index.htm
http://architecturalmoleskine.blogspot.com/2011/10/renzo-piano-maison-hermes-tokyo.html

External links

Office buildings completed in 2001
Buildings and structures in Chūō, Tokyo
Ginza
Office buildings in Tokyo
Renzo Piano buildings
2001 establishments in Japan